Orculella scalaris is a species of air-breathing land snail, a terrestrial pulmonate gastropod mollusc in the family Orculidae.

Geographic distribution
O. scalaris is endemic to Greece, where it is restricted to the island of Dia, north of Crete.

See also
List of non-marine molluscs of Greece

References 

Orculidae
Molluscs of Europe
Endemic fauna of Greece
Gastropods described in 2004